Doru Spînu (born 23 August 1955) is a Romanian former water polo player. He competed at the 1976 Summer Olympics and the 1980 Summer Olympics.

See also
 Romania men's Olympic water polo team records and statistics
 List of men's Olympic water polo tournament goalkeepers

References

External links
 

1955 births
Living people
Water polo players from Bucharest
Romanian male water polo players
Water polo goalkeepers
Olympic water polo players of Romania
Water polo players at the 1976 Summer Olympics
Water polo players at the 1980 Summer Olympics